The Ōwaka River, until 2019 officially the Owaka River, flows southeastward through The Catlins, an area of the southern South Island of New Zealand. The Ōwaka River is located within the Clutha District.

The small town of Owaka is situated about one kilometre from the south bank of the river. The locality of Tahora was located at the Ōwaka River where the road and railway crossed the river; there is little trace of that settlement visible today.

References

Rivers of Otago
The Catlins
Rivers of New Zealand
Clutha District